Bradley Walker is an American bluegrass and country music singer and songwriter.

Early life
Bradley Walker is a native of Athens, Alabama. He was born with muscular dystrophy, and has been in a wheelchair all his life. He was a student at East Limestone High School where he played percussion in the school band.

Walker started singing when he was two or three years old, and began performing in public when he was four.  When he was ten, he was invited on stage to perform with The Oak Ridge Boys, and when he was eleven, he sang with The Oak Ridge Boys on The Nashville Network's Nashville Now as well as on the Jerry Lewis MDA Telethon.

He works at the Browns Ferry Nuclear Power Plant as a Material Inventory Coordinator while pursuing a music career.

Music career
In 1998,  Walker formed a band, The Trinity Mountain Boys, and began to perform at bluegrass festivals. In 2001, he joined the Georgia-based group Lost Horizon.  He was signed to Rounder Records, and released his debut album, Highway of Dreams, in 2006. The album was produced by Carl Jackson.  For his performance on the album, he won the Male Vocalist of the Year Award from the International Bluegrass Music Association.

2016:  Call Me Old-Fashioned
Walker's second album, Call Me Old-Fashioned, was produced by Rory Feek and recorded at the Joey + Rory studio out on their farm.  Walker had known Joey and Rory Feek since 2007, and he was asked by Rory Feek to sing the hymn "Leave It There" at the funeral of Joey Feek in accordance with her wishes. Bill Gaither of the Gaither Music Group, who was also at the funeral service, heard Walker's performance and signed Walker to his label. The album includes a posthumous duet with Joey Feek, "In The Time That You Gave Me",  using vocals she recorded before her death. The album was released on September 23, 2016, and debuted at No. 9 on the Top Country Albums chart.

2017–18: Blessed: Hymns & Songs of Faith 
On October 6, 2017, Walker released Blessed: Hymns & Songs of Faith. The album, produced by Ben Isaacs, features collaborations with Vince Gill, Alison Krauss, Rhonda Vincent, Jimmy Fortune, The Oak Ridge Boys, The Isaacs and Ricky Skaggs.  The album received a GMA Dove Award for the Bluegrass/Country/Roots Album of the Year in 2018.

He also performed a song "Leave It There" in the Homecoming CD/DVD release Give the World A Smile in 2017.

2019
Walker appeared at the Crossroads Guitar Festival 2019 alongside Vince Gill.

2020

In 2020, Walker collaborated with Jimmy Fortune, Ben Isaacs, and Mike Rogers to release an album Brotherly Love and a concert DVD/TV special filmed at Rory Feek's barn/studio near Columbia, TN. The album was released digitally on May 29, 2020, and the DVD and CD released on September 4, 2020. The concert film aired on the Circle network on October 20, 2020.

Discography

Albums

Singles

Music videos

Awards and nominations

References

American country singer-songwriters
American male singer-songwriters
Country musicians from Alabama
Living people
1978 births
People with muscular dystrophy
21st-century American singers
21st-century American male singers
Singer-songwriters from Alabama